Kodlamane is a Tirth Khestra and Hindu pilgrimage site in Honnavar Taluka of Uttara Kannada district in Karnataka state, India. It is the site of Kodlamane Shree Vishnumurthy Temple of Serenity and Mystery, an ancient well-preserved Tirth Kshetra. According to local legend, the temple was discovered in the middle of dense hill forest several centuries ago. A natural stream called Vishnu Tirth flows next to the temple.

Designed and built on Vedic Hindu architecture, the temple is dedicated to Lord Vishnu, who is the only giver of Moksha or Mukti, and is a place of great spiritual significance and Mukti Stal. The temple is one kilometer from Idagunji and 23 km from Honnavar Taluk. This temple is famous for Darshana Seva.

References

Hindu pilgrimage sites in India
Hinduism in Karnataka
Tourist attractions in Uttara Kannada district